Richard Hanson (born February 20, 1940) served as secretary of state of Missouri in 1994 following the removal from office of his predecessor, Judith Moriarty.

A Democrat from Cole County, Hanson served on an interim basis in 1994 from the time of Moriarty's removal from office by the Missouri Supreme Court following her impeachment by the Missouri House of Representatives until Governor Mel Carnahan appointed Bekki Cook to serve until the following scheduled election for the office.

References

Secretaries of State of Missouri
Missouri Democrats
People from Cole County, Missouri
1940 births
Living people